The Ontario Tower, located in Blackwall in the former docklands area of east London, is a residential housing block in the New Providence Wharf development on the north side of the River Thames.

It was built by property development company Ballymore and designed by architects Skidmore, Owings and Merrill. The Ontario Tower is a primarily glass and aluminium design. Its roof is sloped, with a blue LED-rimmed elliptical profile.

Construction began in 2004 and was completed in 2007. The tower is 155.55m in height, has 32 floors and 256 apartments.

References

Residential skyscrapers in London
Residential buildings completed in 2007
Skyscrapers in the London Borough of Tower Hamlets
Buildings and structures in the London Borough of Tower Hamlets
Blackwall, London